An outdoor 1994 sculpture of Fiorello H. La Guardia by Neil Estern is installed in Greenwich Village, New York City in LaGuardia Gardens, which is located at 547 LaGuardia Place between Bleecker and W. 3rd Street.

See also

 1994 in art

References

1994 establishments in New York City
1994 sculptures
Greenwich Village
Monuments and memorials in Manhattan
Outdoor sculptures in Manhattan
Sculptures of men in New York City
Statues in New York City